Fort McCarthy is a fort from the colonial British Gold Coast period in present-day Ghana.

The fort is a ruin in Cape Coast, of the Central Region of Ghana.

References

McCarthy
Cape Coast
Gold Coast (British colony)